Rotenbach or Rötenbach may refer to:

 Rötenbach (Fichtenberger Rot), a river of Baden-Württemberg, Germany, tributary of the Rot
 Rötenbach (Friedenweiler), a  village in the Black Forest, currently belonging to Friedenweiler
 Rotenbach (Jagst), a river of Baden-Württemberg, Germany, tributary of the Jagst
 Rötenbach (Kinzig), a river of Baden-Württemberg, Germany, tributary of the Kinzig
 Rötenbach (Kocher), a river of Baden-Württemberg, Germany, tributary of the Kocher
 Rotenbach (Rems), a river of Baden-Württemberg, Germany, tributary of the Rems
 Rötenbach bei Calw, a district of Bad Teinach-Zavelstein, Baden-Württemberg, Germany